Parkland (also Pretty Man) is an unincorporated community in Tazewell County, Illinois, United States.

Notable people
United States Representative Harold H. Velde (1910-1985) was born in Parkland.

Notes

Unincorporated communities in Tazewell County, Illinois
Unincorporated communities in Illinois